Univox was a musical instrument brand of Unicord Corporation from the early 1960s, when they purchased the Amplifier Corporation of America of Westbury, New York and began to market a line of guitar amplifiers. Univox also distributed guitars by Matsumoku, effects units by Shin-Ei Companion, and synthesizers by Crumar and Korg.

In 1985, Unicord Corporation was purchased by Korg, and the Univox brand was phased out.

History
In the early 1960s the Unicord Corporation, a manufacturer of electric transformers, purchased the Amplifier Corporation of America and began marketing a line of amplifiers under the name of Univox. The company was purchased by Gulf+Western in 1967.

Univox-branded fretted instruments (electric and acoustic guitars and electric basses) began being imported from Japanese contract manufacturer Matsumoku in 1975, where they continued until 1982, after which instruments were made in Korea under the "Westbury" brand. The Unicord Corporation was purchased by Korg in 1985, effectively ending the line.

Univox was best known for its copies of instruments from better-known companies such as Fender, Gibson, Rickenbacker, Ampeg/Dan Armstrong, Epiphone and others. The Univox Hi-Flier was based loosely on the distinctive Mosrite "reverse swept" shape; it was popularized in the early 1990s by Kurt Cobain, almost two decades after original production had ceased.

Change to Stage amplifiers
The Univox name developed a market reputation as cheap because Unicord had copied amplifier designs from companies such as Shure and Electro-Voice instead of doing major original research and development. Univox used time-proven electronic circuits and quality components, but to avoid the negative market perception Unicord introduced the Stage brand; the only difference between the Univox and Stage equipment was the nameplate, attached prior to shipping.

Relationship to Korg and Marshall
Unicord was also the U.S. distributor for both Marshall amplifiers and Korg synthesizers.

The Marshalls used EL34 output tubes, but as they could barely reach the rated output wattage Unicord replaced them with KT88 tubes before shipping to U.S. vendors.

Unicord had begun as a manufacturer of electrical transformers. When the original Marshalls came to the U.S., Unicord's engineers were concerned that the output transformers could not reliably handle the full output. Unicord redesigned the output transformers and told Marshall to use the Unicord design in all units shipped to the U.S., and Marshall could use the design outside the U.S. if they wanted to. Marshall did adopt the Unicord design for all their tube amps.

Tony Frank, the design engineer at Unicord, created the dual-volume-control two-stage pre-amp that Marshall introduced with their 4140 and 2150 amplifiers, which allowed a "super-dirty" fuzz even at extremely low volumes.

Products

Univox amplifiers

A number of tube and solid-state amplifiers were produced by Univox over the years. These ranged from small practice combo amps to powerful heads with separate cabinets. Some models had built-in spring reverb and tremolo effects. In 1971 Univox introduced the B Group amplifiers, covered in two-toned blue or gray Tolex with distinctive ovaloid cosmetics. The C-Group (UX) line of amps were used by The Jeff Beck Group and Led Zeppelin.

Univox guitars
In about 1967 Unicord merged with Merson, an importer of various headstock-brand guitars such as Tempo, Giannini and Hagström. This new company was called "Merson Musical Products, A Division of Unicord Incorporated, A Gulf + Western Systems Company." Around 1968, they started producing Univox-brand guitars.  Unicord and Merson split in 1975, but Unicord continued to make Univox guitars until about 1978, even adding some newer models.

Electric guitars

Badazz
Coily
Custom
Custom 335 (six and twelve-string versions)
Deluxe

Effie (six and twelve-string versions)
Gimmie
HR-2
Hi-Flier
Les Paul Copy (black and goldtop)
Limited Edition Series (double-cut Les Paul Junior copy)
Lucy
Mother/Rhythm and Blues
Pro (Jazzbix)
Ripper
UC-2
UC-3
Westbury Performer

Bass guitars
Badazz
Coily
Hi-Flier
Naked
Precisely
Professional
Stereo
UB-1
'Lectra

Acoustic guitars
Auditorium
Artist Series
Dove
'Grass

Univox keyboards

Univox K4
Univox MaxiKorg K3
Univox MiniKorg K1/K2
Univox Stringman (see )

Univox Drum Machines

 Univox JR-4 
 Univox SR-55
 Univox SR-95
 Univox SR-120

Univox effects

Univox had many effects units, generally made by Shin-Ei, but perhaps their most well known was the Super-Fuzz Pedal, used by Pete Townshend. Univox also produced the Uni-Vibe, a chorus/vibrato that attempted to emulate a Leslie speaker effect popularized by Jimi Hendrix.

References

External links

 VintageUnivox.com  

 "Lawsuit" copies discussion
 Matsumoku: Guitars Made in Japan

Guitar amplifier manufacturers
Audio equipment manufacturers of the United States